Little Failure is a 2014 memoir by American writer Gary Shteyngart.

According to a review in The Guardian by J. Robert Lennon, the book is framed by a panic attack Shteyngart suffered in 1996 after seeing a picture of the Chesme Church in a New York City bookshop.

A comedic book trailer for the memoir featured Rashida Jones, James Franco, Jonathan Franzen, and Alex Karpovsky.

References

Autobiographies